Black is a Bangladeshi rock band formed in 1998 in Dhaka originally formed by Jon Kabir (lead singer, rhythm guitars), Mushfeque Jahan (lead guitars), Mahmudul Karim Miraz (bass guitars), Tony Vincent (drums) and Tahsan Rahman Khan (keyboards) who joined the band in 2000.

After signing a contract with G-Series, Black broke through the mainstream with their debut studio album "আমার পৃথিবী (Amar Prithibi)" (2002). Since then, they have released five studio albums and have appeared in some mixed albums. Their latest album "ঊনমানুষ (Unomanush)" was released in 2016 by G-Series. They were one of key rock bands of the 2000s along with Nemesis and Stentorian, who popularized alternative rock music in Bangladesh.

History

Formation and Early Days (1997–1998) 

Childhood friends and schoolmates Jahangir "Jon" Kabir, Mushfeque Jahan, and Tony Vincent (Mehmood Afridi Tony) always shared a similar passion for music. Their time was mostly spent at each other's houses listening to records from bands such as Pearl Jam, Stone Temple Pilots, Soundgarden. Pearl Jam's debut album Ten had a profound effect on the three and is said to have been the tipping point at which they decided to take up music professionally. After convincing each other about their musical skills the trio decided to form a band and soon enough they were jamming at their friend's homes. Initially, they decided to name their group "Dope Smuglazz", as a wink to the irreverent parental fears of rock music and its supposed concurrent substance abuse, but soon enough shifted to the name "Black" by a suggestion from a friend, classmate, and future band member Asif Haque. The band would then be introduced to Zubair Hossain Imon, an old acquaintance of guitar player Asif, whom the band considers to be "The Stalwart Member" and their "Philosophical Mentor". He is widely known for helping the band with their songwriting, often directly contributing words and ideas.

Black was formed in 1998 with the five members of Jon in vocals, Jahan in guitar, Tony in drums, Asif for additional guitar work, and Tamzid Siddiq Spondon in bass. Soon enough Spondon and Asif parted ways with the band to follow their own interests.

"আমার পৃথিবী (Amar Prithibi)" (2001–2002) 

In 2002, Black released their debut album titled আমার পৃথিবী (Amar Prithibi). Work began on the album in late 2001, between which they had also released several other singles in various compilation albums, and came into completion fall of 2002. This album includes some of their classical hit songs like "আমরা (Amra)", "আমার পৃথিবী (Amar Prithibi)" and "কোথায় (Kothay)". The album also displayed Black's earlier heavy music influences in songs like "কবর (Kobor)" and "অন্ধকারের পাশে (Andhokarer Pashe)".

"উৎসবের পর (Utshober Por)" and "Offbeat" (2003–2004) 

Shortly after the release of আমার পৃথিবী (Amar Prithibi), Black started working on their second studio album under the title উৎসবের পর (Utshober Por). This album was completed in a much shorter time since the band already had enough material from আমার পৃথিবী (Amar Prithibi) for a second album. The album was a departure from Black's usually heavy and alternative styling and instead focused on more mellow and folk-oriented tunes and dealt with more self-exploratory writing. The album includes hit singles like "উৎসবের পর (Utshober Por)" and "শ্লোক (Shlok)", which received frequent playback in commercial radio stations.

Considering the sudden emergence of piracy in music, the album had sold well enough to have superseded আমার পৃথিবী (Amar Prithibi). The album was received fairly well by critics despite having sold so well. Soon after releasing উৎসবের পর (Utshober Por), the band took a stab at acting. The members of Black were cast as a ragtag group of street urchins in the teleplay "Offbeat". The soundtrack to the song সে যে বসে আছে(Se Je Boshe Ache)  had been a collaborative effort between Black and Arnob.

Death of Imran Ahmed Choudhury Mobin

On 20 April 2005, returning home after successfully completing a tour in Chittagong the bus in which the band was on, crashed near a ditch on the road. The crash caused the death of Imran Ahmed Choudhury Mobin, a prominent sound engineer in the Bangladesh music industry and a close friend of the band. Band members Jon, Jahan and Tahsan suffered minor bruises and cuts while Tony and Miraz had to be hospitalised. The members of the band announced a hiatus until further notice. Miraz had been diagnosed with a permanently damaged patella and had to leave the band indefinitely.

"আবার (Abar)" (2007–2008) 

After a five-year hiatus Black released their third studio album আবার (Abar) at 10 July 2008. Under the sponsorship of Warid Telecom a press conference was held at Bashundhara City shopping mall, followed by a gala event for the album's launch. A documentary chronicling Black's career, including Imran Ahmed Choudhury Mobin's death, was shown and released publicly prior to আবার (Abar) being launched. It was produced under Black's supervision and released through the G-Series label. The documentary features interviews by notable artists and figures amongst the Bangladesh music industry such as, Isha Khan Duray, Azam Khan, Saidus Sumon, Sheikh Monirul Alam Tipu and Iqbal Asif Jewel. This album was stated as one of the most commercially successful album in the history of Bangladeshi rock music.

"Black" (2009–2011) 

In late 2009, Black stated on their official Facebook page they had started working on their fourth studio album since June and that it is planned to be self-titled, a first for the band. In mid 2010, bass player Shahriar Sagar parted with the band paving the way for former Aashor member Rafiqul Ahsan Titu to take the place. Upon his joining vocalist Jon Kabir says:

Black released their 4th album, Black on 21 August 2011. Just after that Jon Kabir took a break from the band for an indefinite time of period. He stated that he along with his wife is going for higher studies in the end of 2012. As a part of that, he's getting prepared and in the meantime Black would perform with guest vocalists in concerts if they want to do so. Besides Jon also stated via Black's official Facebook fan page that he was working on a side project on music but not forming a band neither going solo. After a couple of months Jon opened a fan page on Facebook named "Indalo". It stated that he was working with Dio Haque from Nemesis on drums, Zubair Hasan from Aashor on guitar, Rafiqul Ahsan Titu of Black on bass.

"ঊনমানুষ (Unomanush)" (2013-2016) 

Black released their fifth studio album, named "উন মানুষ (Unomanush)", on 26 November 2016, under G series. There are a total of eight songs in this album. All the songs are recorded in Acoustic Artz Studio. The album was officially launched at RCC with the physical CD. Eventually this is first album recorded by the newly included members Rubayet Chowdhury on vocals and Charlz Francis on bass guitar. Three of the songs have already been released with the music video "আক্ষেপ", "গহিনে" and "অধরা".

Discography

Studio albums
 "আমার পৃথিবী (Amar Prithibi)" (2002)
 "উৎসবের পর (Utshober Por)" (2003)
 "আবার (Abar)" (2008)
 "Black" (2011)
 "ঊনমানুষ (Unomanush)" (2016)

Members

Present members 
 Ishan Hossain – vocals, rhythm guitars 
 Mushfeque Jahan – lead guitars 
 Tony Vincent – drums, percussion, backing vocals 
 Charles Francis – bass

Past members 
 Jon Kabir  - vocals, guitars 
 Ahsan Titu - bass 
 Ashifur Rahman Chowdhury- vocals, guitars 
 Mashuk Islam Khan- vocals 
 Tahsan Rahman Khan – vocals, keyboards 
 Mahmudul Karim Miraz - bass 
 Shahriar Sagar - bass 
 Tamzid Siddiq Spondon – bass 
 Asif Haque – guitars 
Rubayet Chowdhury – vocals, rhythm guitars (2015–2021)

Guest members 
 Farhan Tanveer – drums

Music videos
 "অন্ধ (Ondho)" performed by Black (2002)
 "উৎসবের পর (Utshober Por)" performed by Black (2004)
 "কোথায় (Kothae)" performed by Black (2004)
 "আবার (Abar)" performed by Black (2008)
 "৩৫ (35)" performed by Black (2008)
 "আজো... (Ajo...)" performed by Black (2011)

References

1998 establishments in Bangladesh
Musical groups established in 1998
Bangladeshi rock music groups
G-Series (record label) artists